Perimangelia interfossa is a species of sea snail, a marine gastropod mollusk in the family Mangeliidae.

Description
The solid shell is dark reddish brown. It contains 8 whorls, with 8-10 strong longitudinal ribs, and 10-12 threadlike, darker colored revolving ribs in the interspaces only. The outer lip is simple and somewhat thickened.

Distribution
This marine species occurs off Northwest USA.

References

 Carpenter P. (1872) The Mollusks of Western North America, Smithsonian Institution, Washington  
 McLean J. H. (2000). Four new genera for northeastern Pacific gastropods. The Nautilus. 114: 99-102

External links
 
 Biolib.cz : Perimangelia interfossa

interfossa
Gastropods described in 1864